Baron Belper, of Belper in the County of Derbyshire, is a title in the Peerage of the United Kingdom. It was created in 1856 for the Liberal politician Edward Strutt, Chancellor of the Duchy of Lancaster from 1853 to 1854. He was son of William Strutt and the grandson of the inventor Jedediah Strutt. Lord Belper's son, the second Baron, represented Derbyshire East and Berwick in the House of Commons as a Liberal.  the title is held by the latter's great-grandson, the fifth Baron, who succeeded his father in 1999.

The  mountaineer Edward Lisle Strutt was the son of Arthur Strutt, younger son of the first Baron.

The family seat was Kingston Hall, near Nottingham, Nottinghamshire.

Barons Belper (1856)
Edward Strutt, 1st Baron Belper (1801–1880)
Henry Strutt, 2nd Baron Belper (1840–1914)
Algernon Henry Strutt, 3rd Baron Belper (1883–1956)
(Alexander) Ronald George Strutt, 4th Baron Belper (1912–1999)
Richard Henry Strutt, 5th Baron Belper (b. 1941)

The heir apparent is the present holder's son, Michael Henry Strutt (b. 1969).

Male-line family tree

Notes

References

Baronies in the Peerage of the United Kingdom
Noble titles created in 1856
Noble titles created for UK MPs